Schizopygopsis pylzovi is a species of river-dwelling fish in the family Cyprinidae. It is endemic to the Qinghai–Tibetan Plateau, China. It grows to  body length.

References

Schizopygopsis
Freshwater fish of China
Endemic fauna of China
Fish described in 1876
Taxa named by Karl Kessler